Kaden Kai Rodney (born 7 October 2004) is an English professional footballer who plays as a defender or midfielder for Crystal Palace.

Early life
Kaden attended Friars primary foundation school.

Club career
Rodney joined Crystal Palace at the age of eight, progressing through the academy before signing his first professional contract in October 2021. He made his senior debut for the club against Oxford United in August 2022.

Career statistics

Club
.

Notes

References

2004 births
Living people
English footballers
England youth international footballers
Association football midfielders
Crystal Palace F.C. players